Brian Benjamin Stock (born 24 December 1981) is a former professional footballer who played as a midfielder and was most recently the manager of Weymouth. Born in England, Stock represented Wales at international level.

Club career

AFC Bournemouth
Stock began his professional career at AFC Bournemouth, making his league debut on 22 January 2000 against Colchester United.

He played 145 league games and scored 16 goals for Bournemouth before signing initially on loan to Preston North End in January 2006.

Preston North End
Preston reportedly paid £125,000 for the midfielder. Stock scored his first and what turned out to be only Preston goal in a 2–0 win over Leeds United.

Lack of first team opportunities however lead to Stock being loaned out to Doncaster Rovers in September 2006.

Doncaster Rovers
He then signed for Doncaster on 3 January 2007 for £150,000.

Stock played a vital role in Doncaster's 2007–08 promotion season with assured performances in midfield. He filled in as captain for Doncaster in the final two months of the season due to a foot injury to usual skipper Adam Lockwood. Stock captained the side in their Play-Off Final victory over Leeds United at Wembley, and scored the first goal from the penalty spot against Southend in the semi-finals of that Play-Off campaign. Stock is also known for possessing a deadly long range shot and is also a composed penalty taker.

In the wake of promotion to the Championship, Stock extended his contract with Doncaster keeping him at the club until 2011.

On 14 May, it was reported that Wolves had enquired about Stock's availability for a reported £2.5 million. However it was proved that there was no truth in the enquiry.

Burnley

On 11 August 2012, after long term speculation, Stock joined Burnley on a 2-year deal, joining up with former teammate Eddie Howe. In both his seasons at Burnley, first under Howe and, then later, under Sean Dyche he was a first-team squad player but not a regular. He left Burnley at the end of his contract following the 2013–14 season and signed for Havant and Waterlooville in September 2014.

International career
On 17 March 2008, Stock was called up for the Wales team for the friendly match against Luxembourg, although he did not actually play in the match. He has also represented the Wales Under-21 team. Stock made his Wales debut on 9 September 2009, in a World Cup Qualifying match at home to Russia.

Coaching career
On 4 September 2020, following the departure of Mark Molesley to Southend United, Stock was appointed manager of recently promoted National League side Weymouth after time spent working as an academy coach at AFC Bournemouth.

On 12 January 2022, following a run of seven successive defeats that left the club in 21st position, four points from safety, Stock was sacked by Weymouth.

Career statistics

Club

International

References

External links
Brian Stock player profile at faw.org.uk

1981 births
Living people
Sportspeople from Winchester
Footballers from Hampshire
English footballers
Welsh footballers
Wales under-21 international footballers
Wales international footballers
Association football midfielders
AFC Bournemouth players
Preston North End F.C. players
Doncaster Rovers F.C. players
Burnley F.C. players
Havant & Waterlooville F.C. players
English Football League players
National League (English football) players
Isthmian League players
English football managers
Welsh football managers
AFC Bournemouth non-playing staff
Weymouth F.C. managers
National League (English football) managers